The North Carolina and Virginia Railroad  is a short-line railroad operating in the U.S. states of North Carolina and Virginia. Formed in 1987 to operate a CSX Transportation branch, the NCVA operates  of track. It is a subsidiary of Genesee & Wyoming. The company primarily hauls steel, grain, and chemicals, and reported 25,000 carloads hauled in 2008.

History
The North Carolina and Virginia Railroad was founded in November 1987, when shortline holding company RailTex purchased from CSX Transportation  of former Seaboard Coast Line Railroad trackage between Boykins, Virginia and Tunis in Cofield, North Carolina. As part of the purchase, CSX sold two EMD GP9 locomotives to the NCVA, though by 1988 only one, built in 1957, was used for train operations. The company started out with six employees and headquarters in Ahoskie, North Carolina.

A significant customer for the railroad is a Nucor steel mill in Hertford, which the state of North Carolina asserted chose its location because service was available from the NCVA.

The NCVA is a subsidiary of the Genesee & Wyoming and was previously owned by RailAmerica.

The railroad's traffic comes mainly from steel products, as well as grain and chemical products. The NCVA hauled around 25,500 carloads in 2008.

See also

Chesapeake and Albemarle Railroad
Virginia Southern Railroad

References

External links
North Carolina & Virginia Railroad

North Carolina railroads
Virginia railroads
Switching and terminal railroads
RailAmerica
Spin-offs of CSX Transportation